Cracker is an American rock band, formed in 1990 by lead singer David Lowery and guitarist Johnny Hickman. The band's first album Cracker was released in 1992 on Virgin Records; it included the single "Teen Angst (What the World Needs Now)", which went to #1 on the U.S. Modern Rock chart. The band's follow-up, the 1993 album Kerosene Hat included the hit songs "Low", "Get Off This", and "Euro-Trash Girl".

Cracker has released nine studio albums and several compilations, collaborations, solo projects and live albums. The band mix influences and sounds from rock, punk, grunge, psychedelia, country, blues and folk.

History

1990s
Shortly after Lowery's former group Camper Van Beethoven disbanded in 1990, he began demoing material along with boyhood friend, guitarist Johnny Hickman. After moving from Redlands, California to Richmond, Virginia, Lowery and Hickman recorded a demo tape, later nicknamed Big Dirty Yellow Demos by the group's fans, which included early versions of songs that appeared on later albums. They eventually chose the name Cracker and teamed up with fellow Redlands bass guitarist Davey Faragher. A brief tour with Virginia drummer Go Weatherford followed.

By 1991, the newly formed band had signed a recording contract with Virgin Records and enlisted the help of several drummers/percussionists (Jim Keltner, Michael Urbano and Phil Jones), issuing its first album, Cracker, in 1992. From the album came radio hit "Teen Angst (What the World Needs Now)", which peaked at No. 1 on Modern Rock Tracks, and a second single entitled "Happy Birthday to Me." The album went on to sell more than 200,000 copies.

A year later, Cracker issued its best-selling album, Kerosene Hat. The album included hit singles "Low" and "Get Off This" (both with official music videos directed by Carlos Grasso), as well as a cover of the Grateful Dead's "Loser." The album sold almost half a million copies that year and eventually almost reached platinum status. Urbano performed on Kerosene Hat and toured with Cracker before leaving the band, along with Faragher. After a short spell with Bruce Hughes, Lowery and Hickman added Bob Rupe, formerly of The Silos, as bass guitarist and Charlie Quintana (Bob Dylan, The JuJu Hounds) on drums. In 1993, Cracker contributed the song "Good Times Bad Times" to the Encomium: A Tribute to Led Zeppelin album. Initially, the band had recorded a rendition of "When the Levee Breaks" but it was deemed "too weird."

Three years later, The Golden Age was released, with "I Hate My Generation" as the lead single. However, the music scene was shifting away from guitar-driven alternative rock, and although critically acclaimed, the album sold only moderately. Following the long-term additions of drummer Frank Funaro and keyboard player Kenny Margolis, the band returned in 1998 with Gentleman's Blues, with "The Good Life" as the lead single. Although the album received only a lukewarm critical response, it solidified an ever-growing and devout following both in the United States and Europe who referred to themselves as "Crumbs."

In 1995 the song "Whole Lotta Trouble," co-written by Hickman and Chris LeRoy, was used in the film Empire Records. The same year, Cracker's cover of the Flamin' Groovies song, "Shake Some Action," was used in the teen romantic-comedy Clueless.

Camper Van Beethoven unexpectedly re-formed in 1999, and in 2004 released the critically acclaimed New Roman Times. During this time, Hickman released a first solo recording, Palmhenge, which received "Voices Choice" accolades in The Village Voice by the rock critic Robert Christgau and a positive review in Blender magazine. Since then, Lowery has performed in both Cracker and Camper Van Beethoven.

2000s
A compilation album called Garage D'Or was released in 2000, with one disc composed of greatest hits and three new songs, and another of out-takes, soundtrack contributions, demos and other obscurities. Rupe departed in January 2000 and was replaced by bass guitarist Brandy Wood. In 2002, the band released its next studio album, Forever which, once again, met with limited commercial success.

The group left Virgin in 2003 with the independent release Countrysides, composed of eight country and western covers and one new, original song. A collaboration with the bluegrass band Leftover Salmon, Oh Cracker, Where Art Thou? (2003), contained bluegrass versions of many Lowery and Hickman compositions. In 2005, Cracker and Camper Van Beethoven started an annual three-night "Campout" at Pappy and Harriet's Pioneertown Palace in Pioneertown, California, close to where Lowery and Hickman met, in which they and several other bands perform, including sets by Cracker and Camper band members performing their own music. Previous years' guests have included Roger Clyne, John Doe, Neko Case, Ike Reilly, Ryan Bingham, Vermillion Lies, Jason Molina and Magnolia Electric Co, Built To Spill, Brant Bjork and the Bros, Clem Snide, Gram Rabbit and The Bellrays.

With Camper Van Beethoven bass guitarist Victor Krummenacher replacing Wood, the band released the studio album Greenland on June 6, 2006, and continued to tour extensively. After the departures of Margolis and Krummenacher, the band's lineup stabilized in 2007 around Hickman, Lowery, Funaro and new bass guitarist Sal Maida, who had played with Roxy Music.

Cracker released a new studio album entitled Sunrise in the Land of Milk and Honey to positive reviews on May 5, 2009. It was the band's first chart on the Billboard 200 in more than a decade, after having sold more than 3,000 copies in a week. This was in part due to the Triple A chart success of the album's lead single, "Turn On, Tune In, Drop Out With Me," which was used in the television show Californication.

2010s
In January 2011, Lowery released his first solo album, The Palace Guards, on 429 Records. In March, Cracker announced Campout East, the east coast counterpart to their Campout festival, to be held in Crozet, Virginia. The first Campout East was held at Misty Mountain Camp Resort and was co-hosted by Sons of Bill. The second Campout East took place in Buena Vista, Virginia at Glen Maury Park on June 1–2, 2012.

Johnny Hickman released a second solo album, Tilting, in July 2012, while Cracker's song "Low" appeared in the 2012 film The Perks of Being a Wallflower and again in The Wolverine and an episode of Hindsight.

Drummer Frank Funaro was unable to tour due to an injury to his arm that sidelined him for all of 2014.

In July 2014, a revival of the Kerosene Hat era lineup toured China. Lowery and Hickman were joined on the tour by original bassist Davey Faragher and former drummer Michael Urbano. Faragher and Urbano also joined the band in recording roughly half of the double album Berkeley to Bakersfield. The other half was recorded with an entirely new lineup that also became the current touring lineup. The album was released on December 9, 2014 with "Waited My Whole Life" released as a single.

In December 2015, Lowery (along with Camper Van Beethoven) filed a class action lawsuit against music streaming service Spotify, alleging that Spotify knowingly and unlawfully reproduced and distributed copyrighted recordings without obtaining proper music licenses.

Band members

Current members 
 David Lowery – vocals, guitar (1990–present)
 Johnny Hickman – lead guitar, vocals (1990–present)
 Bryan Howard – bass guitar (2014–present)
 Carlton "Coco" Owens – drums (2014–present)
 Matt "Pistol" Stoessel – pedal steel guitar (2014–present)
 Paul McHugh – piano, organ (2018–present)

Former members 
 Davey Faragher – bass guitar, vocals (1990–1993, 2014)
 Phil Jones – drums, percussion (1990–1992 – session musician)
 Go Weatherford - drums (1990–1991 - touring)
 Michael Urbano – drums (1992–1993, 2014)
 Bruce Hughes - bass guitar (1993–1994)
 David Lovering – drums (1993–1994)
 Joey Peters – drums (1992-1993)
 Johnny Hott – drums (1994–1995)
 Bob Rupe – bass guitar, vocals (1994–2000)
 Charlie Quintana – drums (1995–1996) (d. 2018)
 Kenny Margolis – keyboards, accordion (1996–2007)
 Brandy Wood – bass guitar, vocals (2000–2004)
 Victor Krummenacher – bass guitar, vocals (2004–2006)
 Frank Funaro – drums (1996–2014)
 Sal Maida – bass guitar (2006–2014)
 Thayer Sarrano – keyboards, vocals (2014–2015)

Timeline

Discography

Studio albums

Compilations, live albums, and EPs

Singles

Other compilations
 The Virgin Years (1995) with Camper Van Beethoven
 Get On with It: The Best of Cracker (2006) Virgin Records greatest hits collection (Not authorized by the band)

Tribute albums
 If I Were a Carpenter (1994) – "Rainy Days and Mondays"
 Encomium: A Tribute to Led Zeppelin (1995) – "Good Times Bad Times"
 Eyesore: A Stab at the Residents (1996) – "Blue Rosebuds"
 Sweet Relief II: Gravity of the Situation (1996) – "Withering"
 Burning London: The Clash Tribute (1999) – "White Riot"
 This Is Where I Belong: The Songs of Ray Davies & The Kinks (2002) – "Victoria"

Notes

References

External links
Official Website
 Audio recordings at the Live Music Archive
Cracker interview July 2009
Live Daily: interview
Pop Gurls: interview
NY Rock: interview
 

Alternative rock groups from California
Musical groups established in 1990
Redlands, California
1990 establishments in California